Borsippa (Sumerian: BAD.SI.(A).AB.BAKI; Akkadian: Barsip and Til-Barsip) or Birs Nimrud (having been identified with Nimrod) is an archeological site in Babil Governorate, Iraq. The ziggurat is today one of the most vividly identifiable surviving ones, identified in the later Arabic culture with the Tower of Babel. However, modern scholarship concludes that the Babylonian builders of the Ziggurat in reality erected it as a religious edifice in honour of the local god Nabu, called the "son" of Babylon's Marduk, as would be appropriate for Babylon's lesser sister-city.

History
Borsippa is mentioned, usually in connection with Babylon, in texts from the Third Dynasty of Ur through the Seleucid Empire and even in early Islamic texts. It is also mentioned in the Babylonian Talmud (Shabbat 36a, Avodah Zarah 11b) and other rabbinic literature. Borsippa was dependent upon Babylon and was never the seat of a regional power. From the ninth century BC, Borsippa was on the borderland south of which lay the tribal "houses" of Chaldea.

The Jewish historian, Josephus, mentions the city in relation to the war between Cyrus the Great and Nabonnedus. The temple to Nabu at Borsippa was destroyed in 484 BC during the suppression of a revolt against the Achamenid emperor, Xerxes I.

In the 1st millennium BC, the city had a large scribal class.

Archaeology
In 1854, work at Borsippa was conducted under the direction of Henry Creswicke Rawlinson, with most of the actual digging done by his subordinates. Rawlinson personally uncovered the foundation prisms from Nebuchadnezzar II's restoration on the Nabu temple. Between 1879 and 1881 the site was excavated by Hormuzd Rassam for the British Museum.
He concentrated primarily on E-zida, the temple of Nabu. In 1902, Robert Koldewey worked at Borsippa during his main effort at Babylon also mainly on the Nabu temple. E-DIM-AN-NA, temple of the bond of heaven, built by Nebuchadrezzar for the god Sin in the court of E-zida was also excavated.

For 20 seasons between 1980 and 2003 the Austrian team from the Leopold-Franzens-Universität Innsbruck led by Helga Piesl-Trenkwalder and Wilfred Allinger-Csollich excavated for sixteen seasons at the site. Early work concentrated on the large ziggurat E-ur-imin-an-ki and later on the Nabu temple. Examinination determined that the ziggurat had a 60 by 60 meter core of unbaked brinks with a mantle of baked bricks (or Kassite and Neo-Babylonian origin) bringing the structure up to 78 by 78 meters. The mantle was covered by a layer of baked bricks bonded by bitumen. Reeds, ropes, and wooden beams were used to bond the layers together. It was found that the ziggurat had been partially hollowed out in Parthian times. Tablets of the Neo-Babylonian period were found. Excavations can currently not be carried out due to political events. The elaboration of the results of excavations within the project "Comparative studies of Borsippa - Babylon" are conducted.

Many legal administrative and astronomical texts on cuneiform tablets have originated at Borsippa and have turned up on the black market. Archives began to be published in the 1980s. An inscription of Nebuchadnezzar II, the "Borsippa inscription," tells how he restored the temple of Nabu, "the temple of the seven spheres," with "bricks of noble lapis lazuli." that must have been covered with a rich blue glaze, surely a memorable sight. The Austrian archeologists have determined that Nebuchadnezzar's ziggurat encased the ruins of a smaller tower from the second millennium BC. When it was completed it reached a height of 70 meters, in seven terraces; even in ruin it still stands a striking 52 meters over the perfectly flat plain. Some tablets have been recovered, but archeologists still hope to uncover a temple archive of cuneiform tablets, of which there were some copies in ancient Assyrian libraries. An inscribed foundation stone has been recovered, which details Nebuchadnezzar's plan to have the Borsippa ziggurat built on the same design as that at Babylon, of which only the foundation survives. Nebuchadnezzar declared that Nabu's tower would reach the skies, another inscription states. The reconstruction under the patronage of Bel-Marduk is summarized on a cylinder in Akkadian of Antiochus I, an example of the region's remarkable cultural continuity.

Gallery

See also
Cities of the Ancient Near East
Short chronology timeline

References

Further reading
Still, Bastian, "Annotated List of Hanšû Land in Borsippa", The Social World of the Babylonian Priest. Brill, pp. 257-265, 2019
Still, Bastian, "Property Sales in the Borsippa Corpus", The Social World of the Babylonian Priest. Brill, pp. 1-4, 2019
Still, Bastian, "Quantitative Analysis of Priestly Marriages in Borsippa", The Social World of the Babylonian Priest. Brill, pp. 245-256, 2019
G. Frame, The "First Families" of Borsippa during the Early Neo-Babylonian Period, Journal of Cuneiform Studies, vol. 36, no. 1, pp. 67–80, 1984
John P. Peters, The Tower of Babel at Borsippa, Journal of the American Oriental Society, vol. 41, pp. 157–159, 1921
Francis Joannes, Archives de Borsippa la famille Ea-Iluta-Bani : etude d'un lot d'archives familiales en Babylonie du VIIIe au Ve siecle av. J.-C, Droz, 1989
Caroline Waerzeggers, The Carians of Borsippa, Iraq, vol. 68, pp. 1–22, 2006
Caroline Waerzeggers, The Ezida temple of Borsippa Priesthood, cult, archives (Achaemenid History vol. 15), Leiden, 2010

External links

Google Maps link to the Borsippa ziggurat.
Birs Nimrud - Iraq Cultural Heritage .

1854 archaeological discoveries
Babil Governorate
Sumerian cities
Former populated places in Iraq
Archaeological sites in Iraq
Tower of Babel